Mayor Goodman may refer to numerous mayors:

United States
 Carolyn Goodman (born 1939), American politician, 22nd mayor of Las Vegas, Nevada since 2011
 George Nicholas Goodman (1895–1959), American pharmacist, mayor of Mesa, Arizona from 1938 to 1942, 1946 to 1948, 1952 to 1956
 Oscar Goodman (born 1939), American attorney and politician, 21st mayor of Las Vegas, Nevada from 1999 to 2011
 Philip H. Goodman (1914–1976), American politician, 42nd mayor of Baltimore, Maryland from 1962 to 1963

United Kingdom
 George Goodman (politician) (1791–1869), English wool-stapler and politician, 1st mayor of Leeds, England in 1836 and 1847